Remote Sensing in Ecology and Conservation is an academic journal published by John Wiley & Sons on behalf of the Zoological Society of London (ZSL) about ecology and remote sensing.
According to the Journal Citation Reports, the journal has a 2020 impact factor of 5.481. It is edited by Nathalie Pettorelli (ZSL).

References

External links

Ecology journals
Remote sensing journals
Wiley (publisher) academic journals
Publications established in 2015
Quarterly journals
Open access journals
Academic journals associated with learned and professional societies of the United Kingdom